This is the discography of English singer-songwriter Judie Tzuke.

Albums

Studio albums

Live albums

Compilation albums

Video albums

EPs

Singles

References

Discographies of British artists
Pop music discographies
Rock music discographies